Jago Art Center is the oldest dance training center and organization in Bangladesh. It was established in 1959 by Bangladeshi Gawhar Jamil. Since its inception, Jago Art Center has made significant contributions to the dance industry in Bangladesh. The Jago Art Center works in both dance education and performance. They have sub-centers in the United States. Dance is performed internationally through this sub-center. In Dhaka, the institute is known as a dance training center.

Description 
Jago Art Center staged the dance drama "Rainbow in a Heart" on January 6, 2012, at the National Theater Hall of Bangladesh Shilpakala Academy in Maryland, USA. "The Rainbow in a Heart" is the first dance drama performed by Jago Art Center on foreign soil. Rosemary Mitu Gonsalves, a student of the US-based Jago Art Center, opened in the United States in 2003 as part of an organization founded by renowned dance master Gowher Jamil of Bangladesh.

Management 
Music director Mir Kashem Khan was the founding principal . Later, Gawhar Jamil himself acted as its principal. Gowher Jamil, the founder of the center, married Rahshan Jamil in 1952 and converted to Islam. After his death, renowned dancer and actress Rahshan Jamil was under his care for a long time.

Significant dance 

 Anarkali
 Omar Khayyam
 Hafiz's dream
 Mother's release
 Slight damage
 The heart of a Bengali woman
 Question

References 

Dance culture